German Type UC submarine may refer to:

 German Type UC I submarine of WW1
 German Type UC II submarine of WW1
 German Type UC III submarine of WW1